Paul Davidson (born ) is an English former rugby league footballer who played in the 1990s and 2000s.

International honours
Davidson won a cap while at St. Helens as a playing substitute for Emerging England in the 15–12 victory over Wales at Naughton Park, Widnes, on Friday 19 June 1998.

References

External links
Saints Heritage Society profile
England Statistics at englandrl.co.uk
Statistics at rugbyleagueproject.org
Statistics at orl-heritagetrust.org.uk

1970 births
Living people
English rugby league players
Halifax R.L.F.C. players
London Broncos players
Oldham R.L.F.C. players
Rochdale Hornets players
Rugby league centres
Rugby league players from Cumbria
Rugby league props
Rugby league second-rows
St Helens R.F.C. players
Widnes Vikings players